Ossan's Love, also known as Ossan's Love HK, is a 2021 Hong Kong television drama produced by HK Television Entertainment for the broadcaster ViuTV. It is an adaptation of the 2018 Japanese television drama of the same name, a story about a young man who finds himself caught in a love triangle between his boss and his roommate. Both the original Japanese version and the Hong Kong adaptation are noted to be the first mainstream television dramas to feature gay romance as the central storyline in their respective regions.

Synopsis
Tin (Edan Lui) has been single his whole life and unsuccessful in getting a girlfriend. One day, he discovers that his boss KK (Kenny Wong) secretly collects images of him, and learns that KK is in love with him. KK confesses, telling Tin that he will soon divorce his wife of 20 years, Francesca (Rachel Kan), to be with him. Tin confides to his friends, only to discover that his co-worker and flatmate, Muk (Anson Lo) is also in love with him. Deeply unsettled by their romantic pursuits, he follows advice from his childhood friend Tze-chin (Asha Cuthbert), admitting to KK that his only feelings toward him is that of respect and admiration for a mentor. Even though Tin has never ever thought about dating another man, he finds himself slowly falling for the caring and understanding Muk.

Cast and characters
Edan Lui of (MIRROR) as "Tin" Tin Yat Hung (田一雄), the protagonist who one day finds himself in the center of a love triangle between his boss and flatmate
Anson Lo of (MIRROR) as "Muk" Ling Siu Muk (凌少牧), Tin's co-worker and flatmate who falls in love with him
Kenny Wong as "KK" Chak Kwok Keung (翟國強), Tin's boss who is also in love with him
 as Francesca Yuen (袁慧珠), KK's wife of 20 years
Stanley Yau of (MIRROR) as Louis Lui (呂俊霖), Tin's casanova co-worker
 as Carmen Lai (賴嘉雯), Tin's nosy co-worker
 as Darren Chow (周政文), Tin's co-worker who has a past with Muk
 as Fong Tze-chin (方梓芊), Tin's childhood friend
 as Pierre Fong (方梓平), Tze-chin's brother
Crystal Cheung as Sis Tin, Tin's pregnant older sister
 as Nancy, Rachel's tarot practitioner friend
Dixon Wong as Chun, Tin's senior classmate
 as Kiko, Chun's fiancée
Kathy Wong as Kathy Ma (馬潔寧), SK's secret girlfriend, who is also a celebrity and is Muk's former classmate
George Au of (P1X3L) as "SK" Wong Siu-kei (黃肇奇), a famous idol actor
Macro Ip of (P1X3L) as Tin's co-worker
Phoebus Ng of (P1X3L) as Tze-chin's Boyfriend

Production
On 13 January 2021, Hong Kong media reported ViuTV's intentions of adapting Asahi TV's hit 2018 television series Ossan's Love, which was an expansion of the 2016 television special of the same name. The original Ossan's Love was inspired by producer Sari Kijima's own experience of being pursued by a female friend. Rather than writing the series as a forbidden love affair between men, scriptwriter Koji Tokuo shaped the story as a genuine romance featuring men instead of a cis male-female couple, therefore avoiding depictions of homophobia.

Ossan's Love quietly commenced filming in late January, in the midst of the COVID-19 pandemic. On 8 February 2021, ViuTV confirmed the adaptation through a press conference, officially announcing the casting of Kenny Wong and Mirror members Edan Lui and Anson Lo. Per producer and writer Tommy Lo, the HK version is an expanded version of the original 7-part series, extending the story to 15 one-hour episodes whilst adding more subplots involving its secondary characters.

Anson Lo was the first to be cast, followed by Edan Lui. Kenny Wong was the first choice to play KK. Rachel Kan, who has been living in Vancouver, flew back to Hong Kong to film the show and had to undergo a three-week quarantine. Ossan's Love is Kan's first ViuTV drama.

Soundtrack
Background tracks are written by Choi Ching-hong. The opening theme "Sudden Feeling of a Heartbeat" (突如其來的心跳感覺) is performed by main leads Edan Lui and Anson Lo, written by Raymond Wan with lyrics by T-rexx. The ending theme (since episode 8) is "Unlovable Leader" (不可愛教主) performed by Anson Lo, written by Key Ng and Y.Siu, with lyrics by Riley Lam.

Episodes

Reception
Ossan's Love took over the time slot of ViuTV's reality show Beauty and the Best, and premiered on 28 June 2021 to generally positive reviews. The premiere week averaged 6.4 viewership points (approximately 420,000 people), and peaked at 8.7 points (570,000 viewers), making Ossan's Love ViuTV's highest-rated television drama since the broadcaster's public inception in 2016. Ratings increased to 6.9 points on the second week, and 7.9 points on the final week.

Cultural impact
Ossan's Love is the first mainstream Hong Kong television drama to focus on gay relationships and same-sex marriage, and is credited for subtly reshaping Hong Kong's political landscape in regard to LGBT issues. According to associate professor Denise Tang of Lingnan University, the show "has provided space for people to start being curious," and is slowly changing public reception of sexual minority groups, which are often marginalised by local Hong Kong media. Jerome Yau, chief executive of LGBT group Pink Alliance, argued that many officials have started to become more careful when using terminology for LGBT.

The show has caught the attention of Hong Kong's political sphere. Pro-Beijing Hong Kong legislator Junius Ho accused the series of violating the Chinese government's desire for a three child policy by promoting childless relationships, and stated that it therefore that would "breach China's national security law." Hong Kong's chief executive Carrie Lam stated that the show's popularity did not suggest that Hong Kongers would support gay rights.

References

External links
 Official website (ViuTV)

2020s LGBT-related drama television series
2020s Hong Kong television series
2021 in Hong Kong television
Hong Kong drama television series
Cantonese-language television shows
Television shows set in Hong Kong
Chinese LGBT-related television shows
ViuTV dramas
Non-Japanese television series based on Japanese television series